The Green Bay Phoenix women's basketball team is an NCAA Division I college women's basketball team competing in the Horizon League for the University of Wisconsin–Green Bay. The head coach is Kevin Borseth. The Green Bay Phoenix entered the current 2018–19 season on a string of 41 consecutive winning seasons, with only Tennessee having a longer such streak in women's college basketball.

In 2017–18, Green Bay captured its 20th straight regular season title and 16th league tournament title. The program made its 18th appearance in the NCAA Tournament, finishing the season 29–4, winning 27 games or more for the fourth consecutive year.

Year by Year Results

Source:

|-style="background: #ffffdd;"
| colspan="8" align="center" | AIAW Division II/Independent

|-style="background: #ffffdd;"
| colspan="8" align="center" | Wisconsin Women's Intercollegiate Athletic Conference

|-style="background: #ffffdd;"
| colspan="8" align="center" | NAIA/WWIAC

|-style="background: #ffffdd;"
| colspan="8" align="center" | Independent

|-style="background: #ffffdd;"
| colspan="8" align="center" | NCAA Division I/Independent

|-style="background: #ffffdd;"
| colspan="8" align="center" | North Star Conference

|-style="background: #ffffdd;"
| colspan="8" align="center" | Mid-Continent Conference

|-style="background: #ffffdd;"
| colspan="8" align="center" | Midwest Collegiate Conference/Horizon League

Postseason

NCAA Division I

NAIA Division I
The Phoenix made the NAIA Division I women's basketball tournament two times, with a combined record of 3–2.

National awards

Mid-Major Player of the Year
 Mehryn Kraker (2017)

All-American Second Team
 Julie Wojta (2012)

Academic All-American
 Pam Roecker (1983)
Chari Nordgaard (1999)

John R. Wooden All-American
 Julie Wojta (2012)

Wade Award Finalist
 Julie Wojta (2012)

Horizon League awards

Cecil N. Coleman Medal of Honor
 Chari Nordgaard (1999)
 Kristy Loiselle (2003)
 Kayla Tetschlag (2010)
 Julie Wojta (2012)
 Ellen Edison (2015)
 Mehryn Kraker (2017)

Player of the Year
 Chari Nordgaard (1999)
 Mandy Stowe (2001)
 Kristy Loiselle (2003)
 Tiffany Mor (2005)
 Nicole Soulis (2006, 2007)
 Kayla Tetschlag (2011)
 Celeste Hoewisch (2011)
 Julie Wojta (2012)
 Mehryn Kraker (2017)

Defensive Player of the Year
 Celeste Hoewisch (2011)
 Julie Wojta (2012)
 Kaili Lukan (2016)
 Jen Wellnitz (2018, 2019)

Coach of the Year
 Kevin Borseth (1999, 2000, 2002, 2003, 2004, 2005, 2007, 2014, 2023)
 Matt Bollant (2008, 2009, 2011, 2012)

Sixth-Player of the Year
 Kayla Tetschlag (2009)

Freshman of the Year/Newcomer of the Year
 Chari Nordgaard (1996)
 Trisha Ebel (1999)
 Mandy Stowe (2001)
 Nicole Soulis (2004)
 Tesha Buck (2014)
 Bailey Butler (2022)

All-League First Team
 Chari Nordgaard (1997, 1998, 1999)
 Trisha Ebel (2000)
 Amanda Leonhard (2000)
 Mandy Stowe (2001)
 Kristy Loisell (2003)
 Abby Scharlow (2004, 2005)
 Tiffany Mor (2005)
 Nicole Soulis (2006, 2007)
 Natalie Berglin (2007)
 Rachel Porath (2008, 2009)
 Lavesa Glover (2009)
 Kayla Tetschlag (2010, 2011)
 Celeste Hoewisch (2010, 2011)
 Julie Wojta (2012)
 Adrian Ritchie (2013)
 Mehryn Kraker (2017)
 Jessica Lindstrom (2018)
 Jen Wellnitz (2019)
 Frankie Wurtz (2020)
 Hailey Oskey (2022)
 Sydney Levy (2023)

All-League Second Team
 Sarah Meyer (1995)
 Chari Nordgaard (1996)
 Rhonda Rice (1996)
 Alison Schultz (1998)
 Trisha Ebel (1999)
 Amanda Leonhard (2001)
 Sarah Boyer (2002, 2003)
 Elizabeth Dudley (2003)
 Nicole Soulis (2004, 2005)
 Natalie Berglin (2006)
 Kayla Groh (2008)
 Lavesa Glover (2008)
 Celeste Hoewisch (2009)
 Julie Wojta (2010, 2011)
 Adrian Ritchie (2012)
 Sarah Eichler (2013)
 Kaili Lukan (2014, 2016)
 Tesha Buck (2015)
 Megan Lukan (2015)
 Mehryn Kraker (2015, 2016)
 Jessica Lindstrom (2017)
 Allie LeClaire (2018)
 Laken James (2019)
 Caitlyn Hibner (2021)
 Bailey Butler (2023)

All-League Third Team
 Caitlyn Hibner (2020)

All-Freshman Team/ All-Newcomer Team
 Liz Reiman (1995)
 Chari Nordgaard (1996)
 Trisha Ebel (1999)
 Mandy Stowe (2001)
 Nicole Soulis (2004)
 Kayla Groh (2005)
 Rachel Porath (2006)
 Sarah Eichler (2010)
 Tesha Buck (2014)
 Mehryn Kraker (2014)
 Caitlyn Hibner (2017)
 Karly Murphy (2018)
 Bailey Butler (2022)

All-Defensive Team
 Celeste Hoewisch (2010,2011)
 Kayla Tetschlag (2011)
 Julie Wojta (2012)
 Adrian Ritchie (2013)
 Sarah Eichler (2013)
 Megan Lukan (2014)
 Kali Lukan (2016)
 Jessica Lindstrom (2016, 2017, 2018)
 Jen Wellnitz (2017, 2018, 2019)
 Frankie Wurtz (2020)
 Bailey Butler (2023)

All-Academic Team
 Amanda Leonhard (2001, 2002)
 Mandy Stowe (2002)
 Kristy Loiselle (2003)
 Abby Scharlow (2004, 2005)
 Tiffany Mor (2005)
 Amanda Popp (2006, 2007)
 Kayla Groh (2007, 2008)
 Erin Templin (2009)
 Julie Wojta (2012)
 Mehryn Kraker (2017)
 Jessica Lindstrom (2018)
 Laken James (2019)
 Jen Wellnitz (2019)

Phoenix in the Pros

WNBA

 Chandra Johnson – Los Angeles Sparks (2003)
 Natalie Berglin – Connecticut Sun (2008)
 Julie Wojta
2012: drafted 18th overall by the Minnesota Lynx (Cut after training camp)
2012: re-signed by the Minnesota Lynx
2013: signed by the San Antonio Silver Stars
 Mehryn Kraker
2017: drafted 27th overall by the Washington Mystics

Europe

 Celeste Hoewisch – Lks Simens Agd Lodz (2012)
 Adrian Ritchie – Nottingham Wildcats (2014)
2014: signed with the Nottingham Wildcats
2014: named European Basketball League Player of the Year

Retired numbers
Green Bay has retired two jersey numbers. Quigley's jersey was retired in 1979 and Barta's jersey was retired in 1988, but there was no official ceremony for either jersey retirement at the time. On February 11, 2011, the numbers were formally dedicated at Kress Events Center.

All-time records

Career records
 Most Points: Chari Nordgaard - 1,964 (1996–1999)
 Most Rebounds: Jeanne Barta (D2) - 1,234 (1984–1987)
 Most Assists: Pam Roecker (D2) - 831 (1980–1983)
 Most Steals: Sue Aspenson (D1-D2) - 315 (1986–1989)
 Most Blocks: Kim Wood - 274 (1991–1994)
 Most 3-Point Field Goals: Mehryn Kraker - 234 (2013–2017)

Single season records
 Most Points: Chari Norgaard - 653 (1998–1999)
 Most Rebounds: Jeanne Barta (D2) - 345 (1984–1985)
 Most Assists: Pam Roecker (D2) - 310 (1982–1983)
 Most Steals: Julie Wojta - 127 (2011–2012)
 Most Blocks: Kim Wood - 108 (1992–1993)
 Most 3-Point Field Goals: Adrian Ritchie - 71 (2012-2013)

Single-game records
 Most Points: Chari Nordgaard - 38 (1999)
 Most Rebounds: Karen Kupper - 22 (1988)
 Most Assists: Pam Roecker (D2) - 15 (1983)
 Most Steals: Julie Wojta - 12 (2012)
 Most 3-Point Field Goals: Trisha Ebel - 9 (2000)

References

External links